The Dartmouth Summer Research Project on Artificial Intelligence was a 1956 summer workshop widely considered to be the founding event of artificial intelligence as a field.

The project lasted approximately six to eight weeks and was essentially an extended brainstorming session. Eleven mathematicians and scientists originally planned to attend; not all of them attended, but more than ten others came for short times.

Background 

In the early 1950s, there were various names for the field of "thinking machines": cybernetics, automata theory, and complex information processing. The variety of names suggests the variety of conceptual orientations.

In 1955, John McCarthy, then a young Assistant Professor of Mathematics at Dartmouth College, decided to organize a group to clarify and develop ideas about thinking machines. He picked the name 'Artificial Intelligence' for the new field. He chose the name partly for its neutrality; avoiding a focus on narrow automata theory, and avoiding cybernetics which was heavily focused on analog feedback, as well as him potentially having to accept the assertive Norbert Wiener as guru or having to argue with him.

In early 1955, McCarthy approached the Rockefeller Foundation to request funding for a summer seminar at Dartmouth for about 10 participants. In June, he and Claude Shannon, a founder of information theory then at Bell Labs, met with Robert Morison, Director of Biological and Medical Research to discuss the idea and possible funding, though Morison was unsure whether money would be made available for such a visionary project.

On September 2, 1955, the project was formally proposed by McCarthy, Marvin Minsky, Nathaniel Rochester and Claude Shannon. The proposal is credited with introducing the term 'artificial intelligence'.

The Proposal states:

The proposal goes on to discuss computers, natural language processing, neural networks, theory of computation, abstraction and creativity (these areas within the field of artificial intelligence are considered still relevant to the work of the field).

On May 26, 1956, McCarthy notified Robert Morison of the planned 11 attendees:

For the full period:
 1) Dr. Marvin Minsky 
 2) Dr. Julian Bigelow
 3) Professor D.M. Mackay
 4) Mr. Ray Solomonoff
 5) Mr. John Holland
 6) Dr. John McCarthy

For four weeks:
 7) Dr. Claude Shannon
 8) Mr. Nathaniel Rochester
 9) Mr. Oliver Selfridge

For the first two weeks:
 10) Dr. Allen Newell
 11) Professor Herbert Simon

He noted, "we will concentrate on a problem of devising a way of programming a calculator to form concepts and to form generalizations. This of course is subject to change when the group gets together."

The actual participants came at different times, mostly for much shorter times. Trenchard More replaced Rochester for three weeks and MacKay and Holland did not attend—but the project was set to begin. 
 
Around June 18, 1956, the earliest participants (perhaps only Ray Solomonoff, maybe with Tom Etter) arrived at the Dartmouth campus in Hanover, N.H., to join John McCarthy who already had an apartment there. Ray and Marvin stayed at Professors' apartments, but most would stay at the Hanover Inn.

Dates 

The Dartmouth Workshop is said to have run for six weeks in the summer of 1956. Ray Solomonoff's notes written during the Workshop, however, say it ran for roughly eight weeks, from about June 18 to August 17.
Solomonoff's Dartmouth notes start on June 22; June 28 mentions Minsky, June 30 mentions Hanover, N.H., July 1 mentions Tom Etter. On August 17, Ray gave a final talk.

Participants 

Initially, McCarthy lost his list of attendees. Instead, after the workshop, McCarthy sent Ray a preliminary list of participants and visitors plus those interested in the subject. There were 47 people listed.

Solomonoff, however, made a complete list in his notes of the summer project:

 Ray Solomonoff
 Marvin Minsky
 John McCarthy
 Claude Shannon
 Trenchard More
 Nat Rochester
 Oliver Selfridge
 Julian Bigelow
 W. Ross Ashby
 W.S. McCulloch
 Abraham Robinson
 Tom Etter
 John Nash
 David Sayre
 Arthur Samuel
 Kenneth R. Shoulders
 Shoulders' friend
 Alex Bernstein
 Herbert Simon
 Allen Newell 

Shannon attended Ray's talk on July 10 and Bigelow gave a talk on August 15. Ray doesn't mention Bernard Widrow, but apparently he visited, along with W.A. Clark and B.G. Farley. Trenchard mentions R. Culver and Ray mentions Bill Shutz. Herb Gelernter didn't attend, but was influenced later by what Rochester learned. Gloria Minsky also commuted there (with their part-beagle dog, Senje, who would start out in the car back seat and end up curled around her like a scarf), and attended some sessions (without Senje).

Ray Solomonoff, Marvin Minsky, and John McCarthy were the only three who stayed for the full-time. Trenchard took attendance during two weeks of his three-week visit. From three to about eight people would attend the daily sessions.

Event and aftermath 

They had the entire top floor of the Dartmouth Math Department to themselves, and most weekdays they would meet at the main math classroom where someone might lead a discussion focusing on his ideas, or more frequently, a general discussion would be held.

It was not a directed group research project; discussions covered many topics, but several directions are considered to have been initiated or encouraged by the Workshop: the rise of symbolic methods,  systems focussed on limited domains (early expert systems), and deductive systems versus inductive systems. One participant, Arthur Samuel, said, "It was very interesting, very stimulating, very exciting".

Ray Solomonoff kept notes giving his impression of the talks and the ideas from various discussions.

See also
 Glossary of artificial intelligence
 History of artificial intelligence
 AI@50—a 50th anniversary conference, including some of the original delegates.

References

External links
 50 Años De La Inteligencia Artificial - Campus Multidisciplinar en Percepción e Inteligencia - Albacete 2006 (Spain).

Philosophy of artificial intelligence
History of artificial intelligence
Dartmouth College history
Artificial intelligence conferences
1956 in computing